Lumberton High School may refer to:
Lumberton High School (Mississippi)
Lumberton High School (North Carolina)
Lumberton High School (Texas)